Torodora loeica is a moth in the family Lecithoceridae. It was described by Kyu-Tek Park in 2002. It is found in Vietnam and Thailand.

The wingspan is 16–17 mm. The forewings have a yellowish-brown basal zone, with an oblique antemedian line. There is a small discal spot beyond half. The hindwings are pale grey.

Etymology
The species name refers to Loei in Thailand, the type location.

References

Moths described in 2002
Torodora